Nutriset is the French manufacturer and trademark  owner of Plumpy'nut, the peanut-based food for use in famine relief. It was formulated in 1997 by André Briend, a French pediatric nutritionist. The majority of Plumpy'nut is produced in a Nutriset factory in Malaunay, and Unicef purchases 90 percent of the supply from that factory for humanitarian aid.

References

Food and drink companies of France
Famines
Companies based in Normandy